located in the north of Johannesburg Sandhurst is an extremely affluent residential area in Sandton, in the metropolitan area of Johannesburg, Gauteng, South Africa. It is the wealthiest suburb in the country and is home to some of the most expensive real estate on the African continent.  Part of the commercial centre of Sandton, known as Sandton Central, lies in Sandhurst.

References

Johannesburg Region B